This is a list of the bird species recorded in the Marshall Islands. The avifauna of the Marshall Islands include a total of 109 species, of which 3 have been introduced by humans.

This list's taxonomic treatment (designation and sequence of orders, families and species) and nomenclature (common and scientific names) follow the conventions of The Clements Checklist of Birds of the World, 2022 edition. The family accounts at the beginning of each heading reflect this taxonomy, as do the species counts found in each family account. Introduced and accidental species are included in the total counts for the Marshall Islands.

The following tags have been used to highlight several categories. The commonly occurring native species do not fall into any of these categories.

(A) Accidental - a species that rarely or accidentally occurs in the Marshall Islands
(I) Introduced - a species introduced to the Marshall Islands as a consequence, direct or indirect, of human actions
(Ex) Extirpated - a species that no longer occurs in the Marshall Islands although populations exist elsewhere

Ducks, geese, and waterfowl
Order: AnseriformesFamily: Anatidae

Anatidae includes the ducks and most duck-like waterfowl, such as geese and swans. These birds are adapted to an aquatic existence with webbed feet, flattened bills, and feathers that are excellent at shedding water due to an oily coating.

Snow goose, Anser caerulescens (A)
Cackling goose, Branta hutchinsii (A)
Garganey, Spatula querquedula (A)
Northern shoveler, Spatula clypeata
Eurasian wigeon, Mareca penelope (A)
Northern pintail, Anas acuta
Green-winged teal, Anas crecca (A)
Canvasback, Aythya valisineria (A)
Tufted duck, Aythya fuligula (A)

Pheasants, grouse, and allies 
Order: GalliformesFamily: Phasianidae

The Phasianidae are a family of terrestrial birds which consists of quails, partridges, snowcocks, francolins, spurfowls, tragopans, monals, pheasants, peafowls, grouse, ptarmigan, and junglefowls. In general, they are plump (although they vary in size) and have broad, relatively short wings.

Red junglefowl, Gallus gallus (I)

Pigeons and doves
Order: ColumbiformesFamily: Columbidae

Pigeons and doves are stout-bodied birds with short necks and short slender bills with a fleshy cere.

Kosrae fruit-dove, Ptilinopus hernsheimi
Micronesian imperial-pigeon, Ducula oceanica

Cuckoos
Order: CuculiformesFamily: Cuculidae

The family Cuculidae includes cuckoos, roadrunners and anis. These birds are of variable size with slender bodies, long tails and strong legs. The Old World cuckoos are brood parasites.

Long-tailed koel, Urodynamis taitensis

Swifts
Order: CaprimulgiformesFamily: Apodidae

Swifts are small birds which spend the majority of their lives flying. These birds have very short legs and never settle voluntarily on the ground, perching instead only on vertical surfaces. Many swifts have long swept-back wings which resemble a crescent or boomerang.

Pacific swift, Apus pacificus

Rails, gallinules, and coots
Order: GruiformesFamily: Rallidae

Rallidae is a large family of small to medium-sized birds which includes the rails, crakes, coots and gallinules. Typically they inhabit dense vegetation in damp environments near lakes, swamps or rivers. In general they are shy and secretive birds, making them difficult to observe. Most species have strong legs and long toes which are well adapted to soft uneven surfaces. They tend to have short, rounded wings and to be weak fliers.

White-browed crake, Poliolimnas cinereus (A)

Stilts and avocets
Order: CharadriiformesFamily: Recurvirostridae

Recurvirostridae is a family of large wading birds, which includes the avocets and stilts. The avocets have long legs and long up-curved bills. The stilts have extremely long legs and long, thin, straight bills.

Black-winged stilt, Himantopus himantopus (A)
Pied stilt, Himantopus leucocephalus (A)
Black-necked stilt, Himantopus mexicanus (A)

Plovers and lapwings
Order: CharadriiformesFamily: Charadriidae

The family Charadriidae includes the plovers, dotterels and lapwings. They are small to medium-sized birds with compact bodies, short, thick necks and long, usually pointed, wings. They are found in open country worldwide, mostly in habitats near water.

Black-bellied plover, Pluvialis squatarola
Pacific golden-plover, Pluvialis fulva
Lesser sand-plover, Charadrius mongolus
Greater sand-plover, Charadrius leschenaultii (A)
Common ringed plover, Charadrius hiaticula (A)
Semipalmated plover, Charadrius semipalmatus (A)

Sandpipers and allies
Order: CharadriiformesFamily: Scolopacidae

Scolopacidae is a large diverse family of small to medium-sized shorebirds including the sandpipers, curlews, godwits, shanks, tattlers, woodcocks, snipes, dowitchers and phalaropes. The majority of these species eat small invertebrates picked out of the mud or soil. Variation in length of legs and bills enables multiple species to feed in the same habitat, particularly on the coast, without direct competition for food.

Bristle-thighed curlew, Numenius tahitiensis
Whimbrel, Numenius phaeopus
Bar-tailed godwit, Limosa lapponica
Black-tailed godwit, Limosa limosa
Hudsonian godwit, Limosa haemastica (A)
Ruddy turnstone, Arenaria interpres
Red knot, Calidris canutus (A)
Ruff, Calidris pugnax (A)
Sharp-tailed sandpiper, Calidris acuminata
Curlew sandpiper, Calidris ferruginea (A)
Red-necked stint, Calidris ruficollis (A)
Sanderling, Calidris alba
Dunlin, Calidris alpina (A)
Little stint, Calidris minuta (A)
Buff-breasted sandpiper, Calidris subruficollis (A)
Pectoral sandpiper, Calidris melanotos
Long-billed dowitcher, Limnodromus scolopaceus (A)
Latham's snipe, Gallinago hardwickii (A)
Common snipe, Gallinago gallinago (A)
Spotted sandpiper, Actitis macularia (A)
Gray-tailed tattler, Tringa brevipes
Wandering tattler, Tringa incanus
Greater yellowlegs, Tringa melanoleuca (A)
Common greenshank, Tringa nebularia (A)
Lesser yellowlegs, Tringa flavipes (A)
Marsh sandpiper, Tringa stagnatilis (A)
Wood sandpiper, Tringa glareola

Pratincoles and coursers
Order: CharadriiformesFamily: Glareolidae

Glareolidae is a family of wading birds comprising the pratincoles, which have short legs, long pointed wings and long forked tails, and the coursers, which have long legs, short wings and long pointed bills which curve downwards.

Oriental pratincole, Glareola maldivarum (A)

Skuas and jaegers
Order: CharadriiformesFamily: Stercorariidae

The family Stercorariidae are, in general, medium to large birds, typically with grey or brown plumage, often with white markings on the wings. They nest on the ground in temperate and arctic regions and are long-distance migrants.

Pomarine jaeger, Stercorarius pomarinus

Gulls, terns, and skimmers
Order: CharadriiformesFamily: Laridae

Laridae is a family of medium to large seabirds, the gulls, terns, and skimmers. Gulls are typically grey or white, often with black markings on the head or wings. They have stout, longish bills and webbed feet. Terns are a group of generally medium to large seabirds typically with grey or white plumage, often with black markings on the head. Most terns hunt fish by diving but some pick insects off the surface of fresh water. Terns are generally long-lived birds, with several species known to live in excess of 30 years.

Laughing gull, Leucophaeus atricilla (A)
Franklin's gull, Leucophaeus pipixcan (A)
Ring-billed gull, Larus delawarensis (A)
Brown noddy, Anous stolidus
Black noddy, Anous minutus
Blue-gray noddy, Anous ceruleus
White tern, Gygis alba
Sooty tern, Onychoprion fuscatus
Gray-backed tern, Onychoprion lunatus
Bridled tern, Onychoprion anaethetus (A)
Little tern, Sternula albifrons
Gull-billed tern, Gelochelidon nilotica (A)
White-winged tern, Chlidonias leucopterus (A)
Black-naped tern, Sterna sumatrana
Common tern, Sterna hirundo
Great crested tern, Thalasseus bergii

Tropicbirds
Order: PhaethontiformesFamily: Phaethontidae

Tropicbirds are slender white birds of tropical oceans, with exceptionally long central tail feathers. Their heads and long wings have black markings.

White-tailed tropicbird, Phaethon lepturus
Red-tailed tropicbird, Phaethon rubricauda

Albatrosses
Order: ProcellariiformesFamily: Diomedeidae

The albatrosses are among the largest of flying birds, and the great albatrosses from the genus Diomedea have the largest wingspans of any extant birds.

Laysan albatross, Phoebastria immutabilis
Black-footed albatross, Phoebastria nigripes
Short-tailed albatross, Phoebastria albatrus

Southern storm-petrels
Order: ProcellariiformesFamily: Oceanitidae

The southern-storm petrels are relatives of the petrels and are the smallest seabirds. They feed on planktonic crustaceans and small fish picked from the surface, typically while hovering. The flight is fluttering and sometimes bat-like.

Wilson's storm-petrel, Oceanites oceanicus

Northern storm-petrels
Order: ProcellariiformesFamily: Hydrobatidae

The northern storm-petrels are relatives of the petrels and are the smallest seabirds. They feed on planktonic crustaceans and small fish picked from the surface, typically while hovering. The flight is fluttering and sometimes bat-like.

Leach's storm-petrel, Hydrobates leucorhous
Band-rumped storm-petrel, Hydrobates castro

Shearwaters and petrels
Order: ProcellariiformesFamily: Procellariidae

The procellariids are the main group of medium-sized "true petrels", characterised by united nostrils with medium septum and a long outer functional primary.

Kermadec petrel, Pterodroma neglecta
Providence petrel, Pterodroma solandri
Mottled petrel, Pterodroma inexpectata
Juan Fernandez petrel, Pterodroma externa
Bonin petrel, Pterodroma hypoleuca
Black-winged petrel, Pterodroma nigripennis
Cook's petrel, Pterodroma cookii
Stejneger's petrel, Pterodroma longirostris
Bulwer's petrel, Bulweria bulwerii
Tahiti petrel, Pseudobulweria rostrata
Streaked shearwater, Calonectris leucomelas
Flesh-footed shearwater, Ardenna carneipes
Wedge-tailed shearwater, Ardenna pacificus
Buller's shearwater, Ardenna bulleri
Sooty shearwater, Ardenna griseus
Short-tailed shearwater, Ardenna tenuirostris
Christmas shearwater, Puffinus nativitatis
Tropical shearwater, Puffinus bailloni

Frigatebirds
Order: SuliformesFamily: Fregatidae

Frigatebirds are large seabirds usually found over tropical oceans. They are large, black and white or completely black, with long wings and deeply forked tails. The males have coloured inflatable throat pouches. They do not swim or walk and cannot take off from a flat surface. Having the largest wingspan-to-body-weight ratio of any bird, they are essentially aerial, able to stay aloft for more than a week.

Lesser frigatebird, Fregata ariel
Great frigatebird, Fregata minor

Boobies and gannets
Order: SuliformesFamily: Sulidae

The sulids comprise the gannets and boobies. Both groups are medium to large coastal seabirds that plunge-dive for fish.

Masked booby, Sula dactylatra
Brown booby, Sula leucogaster
Red-footed booby, Sula sula

Herons, egrets, and bitterns
Order: PelecaniformesFamily: Ardeidae

The family Ardeidae contains the bitterns, herons, and egrets. Herons and egrets are medium to large wading birds with long necks and legs. Bitterns tend to be shorter necked and more wary. Members of Ardeidae fly with their necks retracted, unlike other long-necked birds such as storks, ibises and spoonbills.

Pacific reef-heron, Egretta sacra
Cattle egret, Bubulcus ibis

Owls
Order: StrigiformesFamily: Strigidae

The typical owls are small to large solitary nocturnal birds of prey. They have large forward-facing eyes and ears, a hawk-like beak and a conspicuous circle of feathers around each eye called a facial disk.

Short-eared owl, Asio flammeus

Kingfishers
Order: CoraciiformesFamily: Alcedinidae

Kingfishers are medium-sized birds with large heads, long pointed bills, short legs and stubby tails.

Sacred kingfisher, Todirhamphus sanctus

Swallows
Order: PasseriformesFamily: Hirundinidae

The family Hirundinidae is adapted to aerial feeding. They have a slender streamlined body, long pointed wings and a short bill with a wide gape. The feet are adapted to perching rather than walking, and the front toes are partially joined at the base.

Barn swallow, Hirundo rustica

Bulbuls
Order: PasseriformesFamily: Pycnonotidae

Bulbuls are medium-sized songbirds. Some are colourful with yellow, red or orange vents, cheeks, throats or supercilia, but most are drab, with uniform olive-brown to black plumage. Some species have distinct crests.

Red-vented bulbul, Pycnonotus cafer (I)

Starlings
Order: PasseriformesFamily: Sturnidae

Starlings are small to medium-sized passerine birds. Their flight is strong and direct and they are very gregarious. Their preferred habitat is fairly open country. They eat insects and fruit. Plumage is typically dark with a metallic sheen.

Common myna, Acridotheres tristis (Ex)

Old World sparrows
Order: PasseriformesFamily: Passeridae

Old World sparrows are small passerine birds. In general, sparrows tend to be small, plump, brown or grey birds with short tails and short powerful beaks. Sparrows are seed eaters, but they also consume small insects.

Eurasian tree sparrow, Passer montanus (I)

See also
List of birds
Lists of birds by region

References

Marshall Islands
'|Marshall Islands
birds
'